Min Dawlya (also known as Mathu Shah; 1456–1492) was king of Arakan from 1482 to 1492. He came to power by having his father King Ba Saw Phyu assassinated after his father had chosen another son as his heir apparent. Dawlya proved an able king, however. Known as Hsinbyushin for possessing a white elephant, the king "extended Mrauk-U control to the east and west". He died on the war elephant after having returned from a failed expedition to the Chittagong Hill Tracts.

References

Bibliography
 
 
 

Monarchs of Mrauk-U
1456 births
1492 deaths
15th century in Burma
15th-century Burmese monarchs